A partial solar eclipse will occur on Tuesday, April 11, 2051. A solar eclipse occurs when the Moon passes between Earth and the Sun, thereby totally or partly obscuring the image of the Sun for a viewer on Earth. A partial solar eclipse occurs in the polar regions of the Earth when the center of the Moon's shadow misses the Earth.

The umbral shadow of the moon will pass just above the north pole of the earth. It will be the largest partial solar eclipse in 21st century.

The maximal phase of the partial eclipse (0.98) will be recorded in Barents Sea. The eclipse will be observed on the north-east of Europe and practically throughout in Asia, on north on Canada and Greenland and everywhere in US state Alaska.

Related eclipses

Solar eclipses 2051–2054

Saros 120

References

External links 
 http://eclipse.gsfc.nasa.gov/SEplot/SEplot2051/SE2051Apr11P.GIF

2051 in science
2051 4 11
2051 4 11